Altitude is the height of an object over a datum.

It may also refer to:

Science and mathematics
Altitude (astronomy), one of the angular coordinates of the horizontal coordinate system
Altitude (triangle), in geometry, a line passing through one vertex of a triangle and perpendicular to the opposite side

Music
Altitude (ALT album), the collaborative album released by Andy White, Tim Finn and Liam O'Moanlai under the name ALT
Altitude (Autumn album), the album by Dutch rockband Autumn
Altitude (Yellow Second album), the album by pop punk band Yellow Second
Altitude (Joe Morris album), the album by jazz guitarist Joe Morris

Other uses
Altitude (building), a proposed skyscraper in Sri Lanka
Altitude (film), a 2010 Canadian horror film directed by Kaare Andrews
Altitude (computer game), a 2D aerial combat game released in 2009
Altitude (G.I. Joe), a fictional character in the G.I. Joe universe
Altitude Sports and Entertainment, a regional sports network in Colorado

See also
Altitude Film Entertainment, a British film production and distribution company
Major Altitude, a fictional character in the G.I. Joe universe